Malka is a town and union council of Gujrat District, in the Punjab province of Pakistan. It is part of Kharian Tehsil and is located at 32°51'0N 73°59'0E with an altitude of 285 metres (938 feet). Malka village is 8 km from Guliyana on main Manglia Road, This road goes to Manglia, Thoota Rai Bahadur, different villages and then Azad Kashmir.

99% of people belong to Awan-Malik Tribe.

Population
Malka town have the population of nearly 7200. approximately 3000 registered votes here.

Education
Boy and Girls. High and primary Schools from Govt of Pakistan Established in 1963.
Literacy rate in Malka is 95% in 2018 survey. There are many more highly educated men/women from Malka, who served and also serving in high posts of Army, government and private organisations.

Mosques
8 Mosques and 3 Islamic Madaras located in Malka. The oldest Mosque is Jamia Masjid Malka, located in center of village. its more than 250 years old.
1. Jamia Masjid Malka
2. Madani Majid Malka
3. Bilal Masjid Malka
4. Gulshana toheed Masjid Malka
5. Maki Masjid Malka
6. Haq 4 Yar Masjid Malka
7. Shaheen Marquee Masjid Malka
8. Hospital Masjid Malka

Shopping centers
Malka shopping Market (Bazar) is an emerging marketplace with a huge impact on surrounding villages in last 10 years. You can find all household things, Bakery, (Mithai) Sweets Shop, Grocery items, Meat shops, Vegetable/Fruit shops, Electric stores, Senetory shops, Travels agent, books shop, Medical stores, Tea Shops, Restaurant, BBQ restaurant, Pizza Shop e.t.c.
 	
Awan Market: (Owner Malik M. Yousaf Awan / Malik Mubashar Y. Awan).	
Different types of shops situated in market both sides of main road.

Amjid Market: (Owner Malik Amjid)

Bismillah Market: (Owner Malik Ikarm Malka / Malik Nayar Islam)

Usmania Market: (Owner Malik Usman)

Hospitals
A Rural Health Centre with 24 Hours Emergency Patient Department is working for the patients of Malka and surrounding villages since 1980.

Overseas Pakistanis
Many more people from Malka went to foreign countries for job/business.
Mostly are in UAE, Oman, Saudi Arabia, Italy, Spain, UK, USA, Canada, Greece, Denmark, Norway, Germany, France, Switzerland.

References

Union councils of Gujrat District
Populated places in Gujrat District